Theo Koppen (April 25, 1870 – March 3, 1953) was an American wrestler. He competed in the men's freestyle featherweight at the 1904 Summer Olympics.

References

External links
 

1870 births
1953 deaths
American male sport wrestlers
Olympic wrestlers of the United States
Wrestlers at the 1904 Summer Olympics
Sportspeople from St. Louis